Tongfuxi Station is a station on  Line 8 of the Guangzhou Metro, between Cultural Park station and Fenghuang Xincun station. It is located underground in the Haizhu District and started operation on 28December 2019.

Station layout

Exits

References

Railway stations in China opened in 2019
Guangzhou Metro stations in Haizhu District